The Stomach mansion (胃宿, pinyin: Wèi Xiù) is one of the twenty-eight mansions of the Chinese constellations.  It is one of the western mansions of the White Tiger.

Asterisms

Chinese constellations